Novoblagoveshchenka is a rural locality (a village) in Novonadezhdinsky Selsoviet, Blagoveshchensky District, Bashkortostan, Russia. The population was 5 as of 2010. There are 2 streets.

Geography 
Novoblagoveshchenka is located 24 km northeast of Blagoveshchensk (the district's administrative centre) by road. Olkhovka is the nearest rural locality.

References 

Rural localities in Blagoveshchensky District